William Walker Brown (24 June 1912 – 6 May 2008) was a Scottish professional footballer who played as a full back.

Career
Brown was born in Coatbridge, Scotland. He played in Scotland for Dunfermline Athletic and in England for Stockport County and Bradford City. For Bradford City, he made four appearances in the Football League.

Sources

References

1912 births
2008 deaths
Footballers from Coatbridge
Scottish footballers
Association football fullbacks
Dunfermline Athletic F.C. players
Stockport County F.C. players
Bradford City A.F.C. players
English Football League players
Scottish Football League players